In computing, an extended basic block is a collection of basic blocks of the code within a program with certain properties that make them highly amenable to optimizations.  Many compiler optimizations operate on extended basic blocks.

Definition
An extended basic block is a maximal collection of basic blocks where:
 only the first basic block can have multiple predecessor basic blocks;
 all the other basic blocks have one single predecessor basic block, which must be within the collection of basic blocks.

Uses
Many local optimizations that operate on basic blocks can be easily extended to operate on extended basic blocks. An example is common subexpression elimination which removes duplicate expressions. In its simplest form it is a local optimization, operating only on basic blocks.

See also
Basic block
Control-flow graph
Tracing just-in-time compilation

Notes

External links 
 Basic Blocks - GNU Compiler Collection
 The Difference Between Extended Basic Blocks and Traces

Compiler construction